Owens Cross Roads is a city in Madison County, Alabama, United States, and is included in the Huntsville-Decatur Combined Statistical Area. It was incorporated in 1967. As of the 2020 census, the population of the city was 2,594. The City has a mayor-council form of government.

History
The area has a history that can be dated back to the early 1800’s. Pioneers had drifted into the area from Tennessee, Virginia, North Carolina, South Carolina and Georgia with names such as  Wood, Parker, Craig, Craft, Maples, Carpenter and Brannum, but a gentleman named Thomas J. Owens had migrated from Virginia and was the first to build his family home near an intersection of two roads.

The name Owens Cross Roads was very appropriately chosen since the Owens home was at “the cross roads”. The community grew in size at a steady pace over the years as a large frame business house was erected near the intersection, containing a post office (established 1861), general store and blacksmith shop. Owens Cross Roads first appeared on maps in 1850.

Following the Civil War, the population grew as businesses sprang up and a new school was erected to replace the original log schoolhouse. With the turn of the 20th century came new growth to the neighboring towns of Huntsville and Guntersville, making Owens Cross Roads a welcome stop for travelers between the two larger towns. The town relied heavily on cotton cultivation throughout much of its early history, with some crop diversification coming in the 1920s and 1930s.

Incorporation

Incorporated in 1967, the Owens Cross Roads City Hall sits facing Highway 431 South, a busy corridor of modern life. The city proudly boasts of having the first Blue Ribbon School in Madison County, a highly praised Volunteer Fire Department and a Police Department dedicated to serve and protect the citizens of Owens Cross Roads.

Geography

Owens Cross Roads is located at  (34.586071, -86.458561). The city is situated in a broad valley carved by the Flint River.  Rugged hills and mountains surround the town, including Green Mountain to the west, and Keel Mountain to the east.  Huntsville lies across Green Mountain to the northwest, New Hope lies just to the southeast, and Paint Rock lies across Keel Mountain to the northeast.  U.S. Route 431 passes through Owens Cross Roads, connecting the town with Huntsville and Guntersville.
Owens Cross Roads met the threshold to become a city in 2020 with the population exceeding 2,000 persons under Alabama law 

Demographics

2020 census

As of the 2020 United States census, there were 2,594 people, 794 households, and 574 families residing in the town.

2010 census
At the 2010 census there were 1,521 people, 593 households, and 409 families in the town. The racial makeup of the town was 91.5% White, 3.6% Black or African American, 1.0% Native American, 0.3% Asian, 0.6% from other races, and 3.0% from two or more races. 2.2% of the population were Hispanic or Latino of any race.
Of the 593 households 30.4% had children under the age of 18 living with them, 53.3% were married couples living together, 10.5% had a female householder with no husband present, and 31.0% were non-families. 27.0% of households were one person and 8.7% were one person aged 65 or older. The average household size was 2.41 and the average family size was 2.91.

The age distribution was 23.1% under the age of 18, 7.8% from 18 to 24, 28.3% from 25 to 44, 23.9% from 45 to 64, and 16.9% 65 or older. The median age was 38.1 years. For every 100 females, there were 97.0 males. For every 100 females age 18 and over, there were 107.0 males.

The median household income was $40,625 and the median family income  was $43,750. Males had a median income of $43,889 versus $33,393 for females. The per capita income for the town was $21,542. About 23.6% of families and 31.2% of the population were below the poverty line, including 60.9% of those under age 18 and 6.1% of those age 65 or over.

2020 census
From the 2020 census data released thus far (September, 2021) there were 2,594 people in the city. The population density was 312 people per square mile. There were 1,032 housing units at an average density of 124.3 per square mile. The racial makeup of the city was 85.6% White, 7.7% Black or African American, 1.3% Native American, 1.0% Asian, 0.01% from other races, and 2.9% from two or more races. 2.0% of the population were Hispanic or Latino of any race.

Education
The local school district is Madison County Schools.

Notable people

Edward Troye, painter

References

External links

Cities in Madison County, Alabama
Cities in Alabama
Huntsville-Decatur, AL Combined Statistical Area